Tell er-Rameh or Tall el-Rama is a small mound in Jordan rising in the plain east of the River Jordan, about twelve miles from Jericho. It presently has a Muslim cemetery on the acropolis that prevents it from being excavated. It has been traditionally identified as the location of Livias. The team recently excavating at Tell el-Hammam however, is proposing that Tell er-Rameh was the commercial and residential centre of Livias, while the administrative centre was located at Tall el-Hammam.

Etymology

Identification
Regarding the name evolution from biblical Beth-haram through the Roman-period Livias/Julias to Arabic Tell er-Rameh, Nelson Glueck states that:
"the equation of Beth-haram, Beth-ramtha, Beit er-Ram, Beit Ramah, Tell er-Rameh with Livias (Julias), . . . is undoubtedly correct. It does not prove, however, that Tell er-Rameh is to be identified with the actual site of ancient Biblical Beth-haram. . . An examination of the pottery of Tell er-Rameh proves that this identification cannot possibly be correct."

Graves & Stripling propose that, while Tell er-Rameh was the commercial and residential centre of Livias, the administrative centre was situated at nearby Tall el-Hammam. Tell er-Rameh had no natural water source, and some have argued that it received its water from the hot springs at Tall el-Hammam. Dvorjetski identified Tell er-Rameh with Livias based on the presence of "pottery or mosaic stone cubes from the Byzantine and early Islamic eras."

See also
Plains of Moab

References

Archaeological sites in Jordan
Biblical archaeology
Balqa Governorate
Livias